This is the complete list of men's LEN European Aquatics Championships medalists in swimming from 1926 to date.

Freestyle

50 meter

100 meter

200 meter

400 meter

800 meter

1500 meter

Backstroke

50 meter

100 meter

200 meter

Breaststroke

50 meter

100 meter

200 meter

Butterfly

50 meter

100 meter

200 meter

Individual Medley

200 meter

400 meter

Relays

4 × 100 meter freestyle

4 × 200 meter freestyle

4 × 100 meter medley

4 × 100 meter mixed freestyle

4 × 200 meter mixed freestyle

4 × 100 meter mixed medley

See also
List of European Aquatics Championships medalists in swimming (women)
List of European Aquatics Championships medalists in open water swimming
List of European Aquatics Championships medalists in artistic swimming

References

External links
  Official site of the LEN

LEN European Aquatics Championships
European Aquatics Championships (men)

European Aquatics Championships